iomart Group plc is a Scottish information technology and cloud computing company which provides managed services from data centres and offices across the United Kingdom. It was founded in 1998 by entrepreneur Angus MacSween.

The group takes its name from a derivation of the Gaelic word  meaning enterprise. iomart offered the first consumer broadband connection in the United Kingdom, and was the first broadband reseller through its Madasafish brand. Headquartered in Glasgow, iomart operated a call centre in Stornoway which today is still operating and owned by Talk Talk. The company was floated on the London Stock Exchange's Alternative Investment Market AIM in 2000.

, iomart owns and manages data centres in eight locations. iomart Group operates a number of different brands including Melbourne Server Hosting which serves the SME market, Backup Technology which provides cloud backup, disaster recovery and business continuity, as well as Easyspace, RapidSwitch and Redstation.

, iomart employs 405 staff, two-thirds of whom are based at its offices on the West of Scotland Science Park in Glasgow. Reece Donovan became the CEO of Iomart in October 2020.

History 
iomart was founded in 1998 as an integrated internet and telecommunications company by former Scottish Telecom senior executives Angus MacSween and Bill Dobbie. In 1999 the company received its first revenue from the launch of its business service in conjunction with Richard Branson's Virginbiz.net.

In 2000 iomart Group incorporated and floated on the London Stock Exchange's Alternative Investment Market AIM. Through its Madasafish brand iomart offered the first UK consumer broadband connection. It also launched Scottish consumer Internet Service Provider, Jings! In the same year iomart launched the UK's first outsourced large-scale email hosting platform, ThinkMail.

In 2002 the Telco businesses were sold for £2million to Centrica and in 2003 the group acquired Web Genie Internet Ltd for £437thousand.

In 2004 iomart bought web hosting brand easyspace for £12m as well as hosting and domain company Internetters for £250k. In 2005 it launched the UK business directory Ufindus and launches Netintelligence Managed Services Platform.

2006 saw the launch of Netintelligence as the world's first security Software as a Service product.

In 2007 the group bought its first four data centres across the UK.

In 2008 iomart sold Ufindus to BT for £20m. The following year iomart acquired dedicated server hosting specialist RapidSwitch for £5.5m.

In 2011 iomart were awarded First UK Kitemark for Online Child Safety. The company also acquired Titan Internet for £4.2m, Switch Media for £1.25m, Global Gold for £1.2m, and EQSN for £2.5m.

In Autumn 2012 iomart Group made a multimillion-pound investment in creating its own resilient dedicated fibre network to connect its data centres. The group also went on to acquire Melbourne Server Hosting for £7m and launched Host Your Kit youth football campaign.

In 2013 the company made two more acquisitions, Redstation for £8m and Backup Technology for £23m.

In 2014 the company expanded further with new data centre and infrastructure operations on the east and west coasts of the US plus a £multi-million extension of their existing Maidenhead data centre. At the end of 2014 the company made an announcement that they had acquired rival cloud service provider ServerSpace to further expand the group.

In 2015 the company made two more acquisitions, the Cloud Consultany; SystemsUp for a deal worth around £13m and United Hosting in December, in a deal worth up to £11m.  In 2015, iomart was also identified as responsible for 14% of all the spam originating in the UK.

In 2017, iomart acquired cloud infrastructure provider DediServe in a €7.9M deal.

In September 2018, iomart acquired Bytemark.

In February 2020, iomart acquired the cloud division of ServerChoice Limited for an initial consideration of £2.1m with a further maximum consideration of £0.9m.

In March 2020, iomart acquired Memset Limited for an initial consideration of £3.3m with a further maximum consideration of £0.9m.

Promotional campaigns 

In 2010 iomart launched the "Racks 4 Acres. Powering the Cloud. Preserving the Clouds" campaign. Working with environmental charity Rainforest Concern, the group sponsored an acre of Ecuadorian cloud rainforest to mitigate the additional megawatts of power that is consumed within their data centres. Following this, iomart launched the "#Savethecloud365" campaign with their partner Microsoft. iomart pledged to donate £3 to Rainforest Concern for every Office 365 licence they sold during 2015. In addition, iomart is also giving tablets to forest rangers working for Rainforest Concern in the Cloud Forest in Ecuador.
"Host Your Kit" is a scheme for UK youth teams to have sports strips provided by iomart. In 2012, over 500 youth football teams entered the competition.

Products and services 
iomart offers cloud and managed hosting services, including colocation, connectivity, data protection, managed security, private cloud, hybrid cloud, multi-cloud, managed Azure, virtual desktop infrastructure, and professional services.

Hosted Desktop 
iomart were the first UK cloud service provider to deliver their VDI platform which allows them to integrate and deliver an enterprise Windows 7 desktop experience with Microsoft Office 2010 for collaborative working. Their customers can choose between a private, hybrid or managed cloud platform solution to host their virtual desktops.

References 

Information technology companies of the United Kingdom
Internet in Scotland
2000 initial public offerings
Companies established in 1998
1998 establishments in Scotland
Companies based in Glasgow
Telecommunications companies of the United Kingdom